Laos competed at the 2000 Summer Olympics in Sydney, Australia.

Results by event

Athletics
Men's 100 metres
Sisomphone Vongphakdy
 Round 1 – 11.47 (→ did not advance)

Women's Marathon
Sirivanh Ketavong
 Final – 3:34:27 (→ 45th place)

Swimming
Men's 50m Freestyle
Sikhounxay Ounkhamphanyavong
 Preliminary Heat – 27.03 (→ did not advance)

References
Wallechinsky, David (2004). The Complete Book of the Summer Olympics (Athens 2004 Edition). Toronto, Canada. .
International Olympic Committee (2001). The Results. Retrieved 12 November 2005.
Sydney Organising Committee for the Olympic Games (2001). Official Report of the XXVII Olympiad Volume 1: Preparing for the Games. Retrieved 20 November 2005.
Sydney Organising Committee for the Olympic Games (2001). Official Report of the XXVII Olympiad Volume 2: Celebrating the Games. Retrieved 20 November 2005.
Sydney Organising Committee for the Olympic Games (2001). The Results. Retrieved 20 November 2005.
International Olympic Committee Web Site
sports-reference

Nations at the 2000 Summer Olympics
2000
2000 in Laotian sport